Craugastor noblei is a species of frog in the family Craugastoridae.
It is found in Costa Rica, Honduras, Nicaragua, and Panama.
Its natural habitat is subtropical or tropical moist lowland forests.
It is threatened by habitat loss.

References

noblei
Amphibians described in 1921
Taxonomy articles created by Polbot